Dhilip Subbarayan is an Indian stunt choreographer who has worked in Tamil language films. The son of stunt choreographer Super Subbarayan, Dhilip also made his debut as a film producer with Anjala (2016) and also played the lead role in Sangu Chakkaram (2016).

Career
Dhilip, the son of veteran stunt choreographer Super Subbarayan, has also worked in the same profession as his father, and first won notice for his work in Aaranya Kaandam (2011). He worked as assistant director to Pushkar–Gayathri in the film Oram Po and then He worked both as associate director and stunt master of movie Aaranya Kaandam, which was his debut (but Thamizh Padam released first).He has continued to associate with big and medium budget films in the Tamil and Malayalam film industry and has worked on productions including Arima Nambi (2014), Puli (2015), Naanum Rowdy Dhaan (2015) and Theri (2016). In late 2013, he launched his first film production, Anjala, though delays meant that the project only released in February 2016.

In February 2016, he began acting in his first lead role through the film Sangu Chakkaram. The film, described as a "spoof thriller", features Dhilip alongside Master Nishesh of Pasanga 2 and is directed by newcomer Maareesan, with music by Vishal Chandrasekhar.<ref>

Filmography

Fight Master
Dhilip Subbarayan has received award nominations for the following films:

Actor
 2011 Aaranya Kaandam 
 2015 Naanum Rowdy Dhaan
 2017 Sangu Chakkaram
 2017 Ulkuthu
 2022 Putham Pudhu Kaalai Vidiyaadhaa
 2022 Kaathuvaakula Rendu Kaadhal

Producer
 2016 Anjala 
 2017 Balloon

Awards
 2011 Vijay Award for Best Stunt Director - Aaranya Kaandam
 2014 Tamil Nadu State Film Award for Best Stunt Coordinator - Manja Pai, Ra
 2016 Ananda Vikatan Cinema Award for Best Stunt Director - Theri
 2017 Ananda Vikatan Cinema Award for Best Stunt Director - Theeran Adhigaaram Ondru
 2018 Ananda Vikatan Cinema Award for Best Stunt Director - Kaala: Karikaalan, Chekka Chivantha Vaanam and Vada Chennai 
 2018 Norway Tamil Film Festival Awards for Best Stunt Choreographer - Chekka Chivantha Vaanam

References

External links

Living people
Male actors in Tamil cinema
21st-century Indian male actors
Male actors from Tamil Nadu
Indian action choreographers
Tamil male actors
1984 births